Symmetry breaking is a concept in physics.

The term may also refer to:

a concept in biology: Symmetry breaking and cortical rotation
a concept in mathematics: Symmetry-breaking constraints
a concept in animal behavior: Symmetry breaking of escaping ants
a concept in physics: Landau symmetry-breaking theory